The 1906 Lafayette football team was an American football team that represented Lafayette College as an independent during the 1906 college football season. In its fourth season under head coach Alfred E. Bull, the team compiled an 8–1–1 record, shut out six opponents, and outscored all opponents by a total of 223 to 36. Erastus Doud was the team captain. The team played its home games at March Field in Easton, Pennsylvania.

Schedule

References

Lafayette
Lafayette Leopards football seasons
Lafayette football